The Royal Order of Francis I (properly 'The Royal Order of Francis I of the Two Sicilies' ) was an extinct order of merit of the former Kingdom of the Two Sicilies which was annexed in 1861 by the King of Italy (until 1860 King of Piedmonte and Sardinia). It has been revived by Prince Carlo, Duke of Castro, as an award for services to charity and inter-religious understanding and includes a number of non Roman Catholic statesmen and stateswomen among its membership.

History
The Royal Order of Francis I was founded on 28 September 1829 as an award of civil merit in the Kingdom of the Two Sicilies for distinction in public service, science, the arts, agriculture, industry and commerce.

Although the order was a State Order and the Kingdom of the Two Sicilies ceased to exist in 1860, the Order continued to be awarded by the exiled King Francis II and his brother and successor Prince Alfonso, Count of Caserta, although the latter did so for the last time in 1920, since they were still claiming all the prerogatives of the crown. His successor as head of the Dynasty, Prince Ferdinand Pius, Duke of Calabria who was head of the family from 1934-1960 accepted the de facto existence of the Italian State and abandoned an active pretension to the throne, considering the order to be abeyance. The latter's nephew, Infante Alfonso, Duke of Calabria, and great-nephew Infante Carlos, Duke of Calabria continued this policy, as has the latter's son and heir. 
 
Prince Carlo, Duke of Castro, much like his father, Prince Ferdinand, Duke of Castro, head of the line of the family descended from Prince Ranieri, Duke of Castro has claimed the title and right of Grand Master and bestowed the order.

Notable recipients 

Dames Grand Cross
 Princess Benedikte of Denmark
 Princess Elena of Romania (29 July 2012)
 Sinaitakala Fakafanua
 Princess Katarina of Yugoslavia
 Archduchess Maria Isabella of Austria
 Margaret Thatcher (14 November 2003)
Knights Grand Cross
 Gavyn Farr Arthur
 Nadhmi Auchi
 Zaki Badawi
 Anthony Bailey (PR advisor)
 Abdul Qadir Bajamal
 Robert Balchin, Baron Lingfield (2014)
 Frederick Ballantyne
 Princess Benedikte of Denmark
 Gaston Browne
 George Carey (2009)
 Prince Carlo, Duke of Castro
 Andrzej Ciechanowiecki
 Rachida Dati
 Mor Athanasius Touma Dawod
 Ermias Sahle Selassie
 Ferdinand II of the Two Sicilies
 Prince Ferdinand, Duke of Castro
 Giustino Fortunato (1777–1862)
 Giovanna of Italy
 Gregorios Theocharous
 Ameenah Gurib-Fakim
 Lodewijk van Heiden
 Atifete Jahjaga
 Marcellin Jobard
 Mahmoud Khayami
 Leka, Crown Prince of Albania (born 1982)
 Gilbert Monckton, 2nd Viscount Monckton of Brenchley
 Nicholas, Crown Prince of Montenegro
 Ali Abdullah Saleh
 Khalid bin Faisal Al Saud
 Sigmund Sternberg
 Tom Thabane
 Edward Thomason
 George Tupou V
 Tupoutoʻa ʻUlukalala
 Desmond Tutu
 Filip Vujanović
 Gerald Grosvenor, 6th Duke of Westminster (2006)
 Duke William of Württemberg
 Rodney Williams (governor-general) (November 2014)
 Rowan Williams (2004)
Dames Commander
Knights Commander
 John Alderdice, Baron Alderdice
 Daniel Brennan, Baron Brennan
 John Burland
 Robert Murel Clark, Jr. 
 Desmond de Silva (barrister)
 Charles Denman, 5th Baron Denman
 Matthew D. Dupee
 David Durie
 Robert Todd Giffin
 Nasser Khalili
 Konstantin of Hohenlohe-Schillingsfürst
 Norman Lamont
 Mothetjoa Metsing
 Sione Ngongo Kioa
 Abu Bakr al-Qirbi
 Bandar bin Khalid Al Faisal
 D. Brenton Simons
 Michael Smurfit
 Conrad Swan
 Emidio Taliani
 Washington Carroll Tevis
Knights or Dames
 Richard L. Cosnotti

Unknown Classes
 Gaspare Spontini
 Vincenzo Tineo

Grades

The Order is now divided into three grades (the modern revival has allowed the award to women):

 Knight Grand Cross with sash ribbon and star
 Dame Grand Cross, with ribbon with bow edged in gold and covered with fleurs-de-lis
 Knight Commander, with cross on neck ribbon
 Dame Commander with ribbon with bow edged in gold and cross;
 Knight First Class, with ribbon and cross;
 Dame First Class with ribbon with bow and cross.

See also

 Order of Saint Januarius
 Order of Saint George and Reunion
 Order of Saint Ferdinand and of Merit
 Sacred Military Constantinian Order of Saint George

1829 establishments in Italy
Awards established in 1829